The Northfield Center Cemetery is a historic cemetery located at the western terminus of Parker Avenue in Northfield, Massachusetts.  Established in 1686, it is the town's first burying ground, with documented graves dating to 1714.  It was listed on the National Register of Historic Places in 2004.

Description and history
The Northfield Center Cemetery is located a short way west of the town center, at the western end of Parker Avenue. It is bounded on the east by a railroad right of way, and on the west by a wooded embankment leading down to the flood plain of the Connecticut River. The main entrance is at the southeast corner, and a narrow paved road provides a roughly oval circulation pattern through the grounds.

The cemetery was established in 1686, and is Northfield's first burying ground.  Northfield was abandoned twice, because of King Philip's War in the 1670s and King William's War in the 1690s, and was not permanently resettled until 1714.  The gravesite of Zechariah Field, one of the 1714 settlers, has been identified in the graveyard.  The cemetery continues in active use today, with more than 1,000 burial sites.  The section with the oldest graves is near the center, and features stones of slate and schist, many adorned with winged skulls.  One of the most elegant markers is that of the Allen family, consisting of a marble column  in height, entwined with carved vines and topped by an urn.

See also
 Northfield Main Street Historic District
 National Register of Historic Places listings in Franklin County, Massachusetts

References

External links
 

Cemeteries on the National Register of Historic Places in Massachusetts
Cemeteries in Franklin County, Massachusetts
Northfield, Massachusetts
National Register of Historic Places in Franklin County, Massachusetts
1686 establishments in Massachusetts
Cemeteries established in the 17th century